Virginia Creeper is the third album by American singer-songwriter Grant-Lee Phillips, released on February 24, 2004.

Critical reception
Virginia Creeper was met with "generally favorable" reviews from critics. At Metacritic, which assigns a weighted average rating out of 100 to reviews from mainstream publications, this release received an average score of 77, based on 14 reviews.

Track listing

Personnel

Musicians
 Grant-Lee Phillips – primary artist, piano, producer
 Richard Dodd – cello
 Danny Frankel – percussion
 Eric Gorfain – violin
 Sheldon Gomberg – bass
 Sebastian Steinberg – bass
 Jon Brion – ukelele
 Bill "Luigi" Bonk – accordion
 Greg Leisz – dobro, mandolin
 Leah Katz – viola
 Cindy Wasserman – vocals
 Zac Rae – keyboard

Production
 Gavin Lurssen – mastering
 S. Husky Höskulds – engineer, mixer

Release history

References

Grant-Lee Phillips albums
2004 albums
Zoë Records albums